USS Navajo (AT-64) was an oceangoing tugboat in the United States Navy, and the lead ship of its class. It was named for the Navajo people. Originally called the Navajo-class of fleet tugs, it was later renamed the Cherokee-class after loss of the first two ships of the class.

Navajo was laid down by the Bethlehem Shipbuilding Corporation, Staten Island, New York, on 12 December 1938; launched on 17 August 1939, sponsored by Miss Olive Rasmussen; and commissioned on 26 January 1940. The tug was sunk by a Japanese submarine in 1943.

Operations in Hawaiian waters 
Following shakedown and a brief tour on the east coast, Navajo, an oceangoing fleet tug, steamed to San Diego, where, in June 1940, the boat reported for duty in Base Force, later Service Force, Pacific Fleet. Until the Japanese attack on Pearl Harbor, the ship's towing and salvage capabilities were utilized in the central and eastern Pacific, and then, after 7 December 1941, in the Pearl Harbor area. Interrupted only by a resupply and reinforcement run to Johnston Island at the end of December 1941, it remained in the waters off Oahu into the spring of 1942.

Further operations in the Pacific Theater 

In late April 1942, Navajo sailed to Canton Island where it and other vessels attempted the unsuccessful salvage of the 502 ft. troop ship SS President Taylor grounded on a coral reef. Then Navajo returned to Pearl Harbor whence the boat got underway for the war zone on 12 July 1942. Arriving in the New Hebrides just after the landings on Guadalcanal, it supported operations in the Solomons with repair and salvage work at Espiritu Santo, Nouméa, Tongatapu, and Suva, as well as under battle conditions at Tulagi, Guadalcanal, and Rennell. In October the tug assisted with rescue of survivors aboard the troop transport President Coolidge after it struck mines in the entrance to the harbor at Espíritu Santo. The tug took off 440 survivors which were transferred to the cruiser . Towing assignments during those operations took the boat throughout the island groups of the South Pacific, and once in late November-early December 1942 to Sydney, Australia.

Stateside overhaul 
In the spring of 1943, Navajo returned to California, underwent overhaul, and in July 1943 got underway to return to the South Pacific. At the end of the month the ship sailed for Pago Pago, whence it got underway to tow gasoline barge YOG–42 to Espiritu Santo.

Sunk by torpedo 
While en route to Espiritu Santo on 12 September 1943, the ship was torpedoed by Type B1 submarine I-39 and rocked by an explosion. Within seconds a heavy starboard list resulted in a submerged starboard side. Navajo began going down rapidly by the bow and abandonment commenced. As the ship settled, depth charges secured to port and starboard K-gun projectors exploded. An estimated two minutes had passed before the tugboat sank, 17 members of the crew died during the attack.

Awards 
 American Defense Service Medal
 American Campaign Medal
 Asiatic-Pacific Campaign Medal with two battle stars (NavSource notes the tug was awarded a battle star for its salvage operations between 8 August 1942 and 3 February 1943.)
 World War II Victory Medal

Footnotes

References

External links
 Ships of the U.S. Navy, 1940–1945 ATF-64 USS Navajo
 USS Navajo (AT 64) at uboat.net
 Navajo class at uboat.net
 Vessels/Auxiliaries: USS Navajo from the United States Naval Institute
 "7 December 1941" – Ships in Pearl Harbor

 

1939 ships
Cherokee-class fleet tugs
Ships built in Staten Island
Ships present during the attack on Pearl Harbor
World War II shipwrecks in the Coral Sea
Tugs of the United States Navy
World War II auxiliary ships of the United States
Ships sunk by Japanese submarines
Maritime incidents in September 1943